William M. Chumley (born September 24, 1947) is an American politician. He is a member of the South Carolina House of Representatives from the 35th District, serving since 2011. He is a member of the Republican party.

Chumley is a member of the South Carolina Freedom Caucus.  He also serves on the House Agriculture, Natural Resources & Environmental Affairs Committee.

Politics
In the aftermath of the mass shooting in Charleston in 2015, Chumley said he would not vote to remove the Confederate battle flag from the grounds of the state house. In press reports, he observed "These people sat in there and waited their turn to be shot, that's sad. Somebody in there with a means of self-defense could've stopped this."

On December 13, 2017, Chumley and fellow South Carolina representative Mike Burns proposed building a monument to South Carolina's black Confederate soldiers, although the historical record shows that no such soldiers existed.

In December 2016, Chumley pre-filed a bill that would require the installation of "pornography blockers" on all computers sold in South Carolina with a payment of $20 required to lift the blocker.

In 2023, Chumley was one of 21 Republican co-sponsors of the South Carolina Prenatal Equal Protection Act of 2023, which would make women who had abortions eligible for the death penalty.

References

Living people
1947 births
Republican Party members of the South Carolina House of Representatives
People from Spartanburg, South Carolina
21st-century American politicians